Sensible may refer to:

 Captain Sensible (born 1954), English rock guitarist
 French frigate Sensible (1787), a 32-gun Magicienne-class frigate
 Sensible Sentencing Trust, a lobby group
 Sensible Software, a defunct video game company
 Sensible, an album by Zayda y los Culpables

See also
 Sense (disambiguation)
 Sensibility